"Hallelujah I Love Her So" is a single by American musician Ray Charles. The rhythm and blues song was written and released by Charles in 1956 on the Atlantic label, and in 1957 it was included on his self-titled debut LP, also released on Atlantic. The song peaked at number five on the Billboard R&B chart. It is loosely based on 'Get It Over Baby' by Ike Turner (1953).

The song incorporates Gospel music. "Hallelujah I Love Her So" is a testament to the joyous release of love, featuring a sophisticated horn arrangement and memorable tenor sax solo by Don Wilkerson. Several artists, including Stevie Wonder, Peggy Lee, Eddie Cochran, and Humble Pie have covered the song.

Personnel
Ray Charles – lead vocal
Don Wilkerson – tenor saxophone solo
The Ray Charles Orchestra – instrumentation
Jerry Wexler – producer

Beatles cover versions
According to biographer Mark Lewisohn (in The Complete Beatles Chronicle, p. 362), the Beatles (first as the Quarrymen) regularly performed the song, from at least 1960 through 1962 with Paul McCartney on lead vocal. A very early home recording rehearsal (dated tentatively to May 1960) of it was included on Anthology 1 as well as on previous unauthorized releases. They continued playing it regularly including at The Star-Club in Hamburg through the end of 1962, an audience recording was made there which is included in the album Live! at the Star-Club in Hamburg, Germany; 1962. Additionally according to author Doug Sulpy (in Drugs, Divorce And A Slipping Image, sec. 22.25) on January 22, 1969 during the Get Back sessions, they recorded a version with John Lennon doing a "loose" lead vocal; that version has never been officially released. Lastly, in December 1961 the two singer-musicians who were asked to join the Beatles, Tony Sheridan and Roy Young, recorded a studio version that was released on the Sheridan album My Bonnie (1962) although none of the Beatles participate.

Beatles personnel 

 Paul McCartney - vocals, guitar
 John Lennon - guitar
 George Harrison - guitar
 Stuart Sutcliffe - bass

Other cover versions

 Peggy Lee (single A-side in 1959 as "Hallelujah I Love Him So")
 Ella Fitzgerald on her Verve release Rhythm Is My Business
 Connie Francis (as "Hallelujah I Love Him So")
 Timi Yuro (as "Halleluja I Love Him So")
 Eddie Cochran (single A-side)
 Eva Cassidy (as "Hallelujah I Love Him So")
 Earl Grant
 Jerry Lee Lewis
 Little Stevie Wonder on the 1962 album Tribute to Uncle Ray
 Davy Graham (acoustic instrumental version on 1963 album The Guitar Player)
 Harry Belafonte on the 1958 album Belafonte Sings the Blues, a smart "jazzy" version
 The Animals
 Gerry and the Pacemakers
 Frank Sinatra on My Way (1969)
 Humble Pie
 Brenda Lee (as "Hallelujah I Love Him So")
 Jerry Reed
 The Blues Band
 The Holloways
 Raymond van het Groenewoud translated the song on his 1988 album Intiem
 Ben l'Oncle Soul in a French version called Demain j'arrête
 Hugh Laurie on the special edition of his album Let Them Talk
 Crystal Gayle
 Maceo Parker on his 2008 album Roots & Grooves
 Tony DeSare on his 2009 album Radio Show
 David Sanborn on his 2010 album Only Everything
 Guy Sebastian "Hallelujah I Love Her So" from The Memphis Album
 James Hunter
 Jamie Cullum
 Blue Harlem
 Reverend Chris and the High Rollers
 Lone Ranger in a reggae version called Rose Marie
 Ryan Montbleau
 Neil Sedaka, on his 1966 Australian album Neil Sedaka at Chequers
Elvina Makarian (Armenian Jazz Singer)

Eddie Cochran version

"Hallelujah, I Love Her So" is an adaption of the Ray Charles song by Eddie Cochran. It was released as a single on Liberty Records in November 1959.'Personnel
 Eddie Cochran: vocal, guitar
 Jimmy Stivers: piano
 Gene Riggio: drums
 Don Myers: electric bass
 Mike Henderson: tenor sax
 Mike Deasy: baritone sax

Chart performance

George Jones and Brenda Lee version
George Jones covered the song on his 1984 album Ladies' Choice as a duet with Brenda Lee titled "Hallelujah, I Love You So". It was released as a single in 1984 and peaked at number 15 on the Billboard'' Hot Country Singles chart in 1985.

Chart performance

References

1956 singles
1956 songs
1959 singles
1984 singles
Songs written by Ray Charles
Ray Charles songs
Peggy Lee songs
The Animals songs
Eddie Cochran songs
The Beatles songs
Frank Sinatra songs
Guy Sebastian songs
The Quarrymen songs
George Jones songs
Brenda Lee songs
Liberty Records singles
Song recordings produced by Jerry Wexler
Atlantic Records singles